Vågsøy is a former municipality in the old Sogn og Fjordane county, Norway. It was located in the traditional district of Nordfjord. The municipality's administrative center was the town Måløy. Other population centers in Vågsøy included the villages of Bryggja, Deknepollen, Holvika, Kvalheim, Langeneset, Raudeberg, Refvika, Silda, Tennebø, Totland, Vedvika, and Vågsvåg. The municipality included the island of Vågsøy, several small surrounding islands, and part of the mainland. On 1 January 2020, the municipality was dissolved and divided between Kinn Municipality and Stad Municipality in Vestland county.

At the time of its dissolution in 2020, the  municipality is the 345th largest by area out of the 422 municipalities in Norway. Vågsøy is the 175th most populous municipality in Norway with a population of 6,001.

The municipality of Vågsøy was the second largest fishing municipality in Norway, and it was home to one of Norway's most modern fish-processing plants.

General information
Historically, Vågsøy was part of Selje Municipality (see formannskapsdistrikt law). On 1 January 1910, the municipality of Selje was split into three separate municipalities: Nord-Vågsøy (population: 1,111), Sør-Vågsøy (population: 1,517), and Selje (population: 3,367). Nord-Vågsøy included the northern half of the island of Vågsøy and Sør-Vågsøy included the southern part of the island and some of the mainland.

During the 1960s, there were many municipal mergers across Norway due to the work of the Schei Committee. On 1 January 1964, a new municipality of Vågsøy was created by merging the following areas together:
Nord-Vågsøy municipality (population: 1,476)
Sør-Vågsøy municipality (population: 3,926)
from Selje: the island of Silda, the Hagevik-Osmundsvåg area, and Sørpollen (population: 344)
from Davik: the islands of Husevågøy, Grindøy, Gangsøy, and Risøy; and all of Davik that was north of the Nordfjorden and west of Lefdal (population: 1,216)
The new municipality had an initial population of 6,962.

On 1 January 2020, Vågsøy Municipality was dissolved.  The Bryggja-Totland area in the eastern part of Vågsøy was merged with the neighboring municipalities of Eid and Selje to become the new Stad Municipality. The rest of Vågsøy was merged with the municipality of Flora to the south to create a new (non-contiguous) municipality called Kinn.

Name
The municipality is named after the island of Vågsøy. The Old Norse form of the name was Vágsøy. The first element is the genitive case of vágr which means "bay" and the last element is øy which means "island".

Coat of arms
The coat of arms of Vågsøy is of modern design. The coat of arms was granted on 27 March 1987. The arms show two rudders, used in the one-man boats which have been used for a long time in the village. The rudders are silver and the background is blue.

Churches
The Church of Norway has one parish within the municipality of Vågsøy. It is part of the Nordfjord prosti (deanery) in the Diocese of Bjørgvin.

Government
All municipalities in Norway, including Vågsøy, are responsible for primary education (through 10th grade), outpatient health services, senior citizen services, unemployment and other social services, zoning, economic development, and municipal roads. The municipality is governed by a municipal council of elected representatives, which in turn elect a mayor.  The municipality falls under the Sogn og Fjordane District Court and the Gulating Court of Appeal.

Municipal council
The municipal council of Vågsøy was made up of 27 representatives that were elected to four year terms. The party breakdown of the final municipal council was as follows:

Mayor
The mayor  of a municipality in Norway is a representative of the majority party of the municipal council who is elected to lead the council. Kristin Maurstad of the Labour Party was elected mayor for the 2015–2019 term.

In 2007, Vågsøy participated in a trial where the mayor was directly elected. The sitting mayor, Roger B. Silden, received 44.1% of the votes and won the election. His party (the Norwegian Labour Party), however, did poorer than in 2003 and it became the second largest party with only 21.8% of the votes.

Geography

Vågsøy is made up of the mainland and islands on the northern and outer shore of the Nordfjorden. The municipality is named after its largest island, Vågsøy. Other populated islands in Vågsøy include Silda, Moldøen, and Husevågøy. The lake Degnepollvatnet is located between the villages of Degnepoll and Tennebø.

The municipalities of Selje (in Sogn og Fjordane county) and Vanylven (in Møre og Romsdal county) border to the north, the municipality of Eid lies to the east, the municipality of Bremanger lies to the south, and the North Sea borders Vågsøy to the west.

Attractions

Måløy
Måløy attained city status in 1997. The Coastal Steamer (Hurtigruten) has daily departures. The old part of the city lies on the island of Moldøen, from which the city that has expanded onto the mainland and further west to Holvik, has its name.

Kannestein
Over thousands of years, ocean waves have ground the rock to the shape it has today. Every year many visitors come to Oppedal to take a closer look at the stone. This is caused by stones having split loose, which have knocked and gnawed at the rockface until they have become polished and rounded. Loose stones have then worked themselves deeper into the rock. New stones have come, and in time the potholes have become deeper and wider. Several potholes near to each other have been polished for so long that the sides have been rubbed away, leaving just the middle section, such as the Kanne Stone.

Vågsberget trading post
In 1636, trader Didrik Fester from Bergen came to Vågsberget to open a trading business. There was probably trading activity and an inn before Fester's arrival, and the trading post at Vågsberget has changed hands several times throughout the years. Restoration work is being carried out on Vågsberget, but the café and exhibition is open in summer and guided tours are available. There is also an exhibition featuring old fishing boats and equipment.  Vågsberget is now part of the large village of Vågsvåg.

Silda
Silda, the island in Sildagapet bay, is an old fishing community, which in its heyday had a population of 150 who made a living from fishing and farming. Its current winter population is only about 30, while in summer it is host to several hundred people, staying in holiday houses and cabins. The island has a restaurant perched on a rock out in the southern harbor. There are also cabins for rent there. The jetty in Silda's northern harbor was started in the 1860s and completed in the 20th century. With the exception of a few tractors, the island is "car free", but it has cycling and walking tracks, footpaths and walking terrain. A regular boat service runs to and from Måløy several times a day.

Lighthouses
Vågsøy municipality has four lighthouses. Three of them are open daily and are available for let for short or long periods.

Kråkenes Lighthouse is a working lighthouse and also a weather station that collects important information. Kråkenes lighthouse, which offers views of the ocean at Stadhavet, lies at the most northerly point on the island of Vågsøy and is accessible by road.
Skongenes Lighthouse is an automatic lighthouse with no road access. It is a one-hour walk from Langeneset in easy hiking terrain. There are also views towards Stadlandet. Ytre Nordfjord Turlag runs this lighthouse and offers overnight accommodation and day visits.
Hendanes Lighthouse is an automatic lighthouse on the west side of the Torskanger inlet. It is located a short walk from the road and offers views of Stadhavet and Klovningen.
It was built in 1870, and was manned until 1985 when it was automated.

Beaches

See also
Operation Archery
List of former municipalities of Norway

References

External links

Municipal fact sheet from Statistics Norway 
NRK: Vågsøy Kommune
Official Site of Vågsøy Municipality
Tourist information from Vågsøy
Silda

 
Kinn
Stad, Norway
Former municipalities of Norway
1964 establishments in Norway
2020 disestablishments in Norway